Mountain River is a rural locality in the local government area (LGA) of Huon Valley in the South-east LGA region of Tasmania. The 2016 census recorded a population of 559 for the state suburb of Mountain River.
The locality increasingly is a lifestyle destination, being only about 30 minutes south of the Tasmanian capital Hobart by road.

Neighboring localities are Grove, Crabtree, Lower Longley, Lucaston, Collinsvale and  Lachlan. Mountain River is named for a stream that rises in the Wellington Range and flows through the Mountain River and Huon valleys to join the Huon River near Huonville. Its major tributary, the Crabtree Rivulet, also rises in the Wellington Range.

History 
Mountain River was gazetted as a locality in 1970.

Geography
Mountain River (the watercourse), a tributary of the Huon River, flows through from north to south.

Road infrastructure 
Route C617 (Mountain River Road) enters from the south and runs through to the centre, where it ends.

References

External links
Huon Valley Area website

Localities of Huon Valley Council
Huon Valley
Towns in Tasmania